The politics of Norway take place in the framework of a parliamentary, representative democratic constitutional monarchy. Executive power is exercised by the Council of State, the cabinet, led by the prime minister of Norway. Legislative power is vested in both the government and the legislature, the Storting, elected within a multi-party system. The judiciary is independent of the executive branch and the legislature.

 Reporters Without Borders ranked Norway 1st in the world in the 2019 Press Freedom Index. Freedom House's 2020 Freedom in the World report classified Norway as "free," scoring maximum points in the categories of "political rights" and "civil liberties".

Constitutional development
The Norwegian constitution, signed by the Eidsvoll assembly on 17 May 1814, transformed Norway from being an absolute monarchy into a constitutional monarchy. The 1814 constitution granted rights such as freedom of speech (§100) and rule of law (§§ 96, 97, 99). Important amendments include:

4 November 1814: Constitution reenacted in order to form a personal union with the king of Sweden
1851: Constitutional prohibition against admission of Jews lifted (see Jew clause)
1884: Parliamentarism has evolved since 1884 and entails that the cabinet must not have the parliament against it (an absence of mistrust, but an express of support is not necessary), and that the appointment by the King is a formality when there is a clear parliamentary majority. This parliamentary rule has the status of constitutional custom. All new laws are passed and all new governments are therefore formed de jure by the King, although not de facto. After elections resulting in no clear majority, the King appoints the new government de facto
1887: Prohibition against monastic orders lifted
1898: Universal male suffrage established
1905: Union with Sweden dissolved
1913: Universal suffrage established 
1956: Religious freedom formalised and prohibition against Jesuits lifted (see Jesuit clause)
2004: New provision on freedom of expression, replacing the old § 100
 2007: Removed the old system of division of Stortinget into the Odelsting and Lagting (took effect after the 2009 general election). Changes to the Court of Impeachment. Parliamentary system now part of the Constitution (previously this was only a constitutional custom) (new § 15)

Executive branch

|King
|Harald V
|
|17 January 1991
|-
|Prime Minister
|Jonas Gahr Støre
|Labour Party
|14 October 2021
|}

Norway is a constitutional monarchy, where the king has a mainly symbolic power. The royal house is a branch of the princely family of Schleswig-Holstein-Sonderburg-Glücksburg, and the House of Saxe-Coburg and Gotha in Germany. The functions of the king, Harald V, are mainly ceremonial, but he has influence as the symbol of national unity. Although the constitution of 1814 grants important executive powers to the king, these are always exercised by the Council of State in the name of the king (King's Council, or cabinet). The king is also High Protector of the Church of Norway (the state church), Grand Master of the Royal Norwegian Order of St. Olav, and symbolically Supreme Commander of the Norwegian armed forces.

The Council of State is formally convened by the reigning monarch. The Council of State consists of the prime minister and his or her council, formally appointed by the king. Parliamentarism has evolved since 1884 and entails that the cabinet must not have the parliament against it, and that the appointment by the king is a formality. The council must have the confidence of the Norwegian legislative body, known as the Storting. In practice, the monarch will ask the leader of a parliamentary block that has a majority in the Storting to form a government. After elections resulting in no clear majority to any party or coalition, the leader of the party most likely to be able to form a government is appointed prime minister. Since World War II, most non-socialist governments have been coalitions, and Labour Party governments have often relied on the support of other parties to retain the necessary parliamentary votes.

The executive branch is divided into the following ministries:

 Office of the Prime Minister
 Ministry of Agriculture and Food
 Ministry of Children and Equality
 Ministry of Culture
 Ministry of Defence
 Ministry of Education and Research
 Ministry of the Environment
 Ministry of Finance
 Ministry of Fisheries and Coastal Affairs
 Ministry of Foreign Affairs
 Ministry of Government Administration and Reform
 Ministry of Health and Care Services
 Ministry of Justice and the Police
 Ministry of Labour and Social Inclusion
 Ministry of Local Government and Regional Development
 Ministry of Petroleum and Energy
 Ministry of Trade and Industry
 Ministry of Transport and Communications

Governments 1935–1981 

The Labour Party has been the largest party in Parliament ever since the election of 1927 up to the recent 2017 election. Labour formed their first brief minority government in 1928 which lasted for 18 days only. After the 1936 election the Labour Party formed a new minority government, which had to go into exile 1940–1945 because of the German occupation of Norway. After a brief trans-party government following the German capitulation in 1945, Labour gained a majority of the seats in parliament in the first post-war election of 1945.

Norway was ruled by Labour governments from 1945 to 1981, except for three periods (1963, 1965–1971, and 1972–1973). The Labour Party had a single party majority in the Storting from 1945 to 1961. Since then no party has single-handedly formed a majority government, hence minority and coalition governments have been the rule. After the centre-right Willoch government lost its parliamentary majority in the election of 1985, there were no majority governments in Norway until the second Stoltenberg government was formed after the 2005 election.

Governments 1981–2005 

From 1981 to 1997, governments alternated between minority Labour governments and Conservative-led centre-right governments. The centre-right governments gained power in three out of four elections during this period (1981, 1985, 1989), whereas Labour toppled those governments twice between elections (1986, 1990) and stayed in power after one election (1993). Elections take place in September and governments change in October of election years.

Conservative leader Kåre Willoch formed a minority government after the election of 1981. In 1983, midway between elections, this government was expanded to a majority three-party coalition of the Conservatives, the Centre Party and the Christian Democrats. In the election of 1985 the coalition lost its majority but stayed in office until 1986, when it stepped down after losing a parliamentary vote on petrol taxes.

Labour leader Gro Harlem Brundtland served three periods as Prime Minister. First briefly from February 1981 until the election the same year, then from May 1986 to the election of 1989, and last from November 1990 until October 1996 when she decided to step out of domestic politics. Brundtland strongly influenced Norwegian politics and society during this period and was nicknamed the "national mother".

After the election of 1989 a centre-right coalition was formed with the same three parties as in 1983–1986, this time headed by Conservative leader Jan P. Syse. This coalition governed from 1989 to November 1990 when it collapsed from inside over the issue of Norwegian membership in the European Economic Area.

When Brundtland resigned in 1996, Labour leader Thorbjørn Jagland formed a new Labour government that stayed in office until October 1997 when he, after the September 1997 election, declared that his government would step down because the Labour Party failed to win at least 36.9% of the national vote – the percentage Labour had won in the 1993 election.

A three-party minority coalition of the Centre, Christian Democratic, and Liberal parties, headed by Christian Democrat Prime Minister Kjell Magne Bondevik, moved into office in October 1997. That government fell in March 2000 over the issue of proposed natural gas plants, opposed by Bondevik due to their impact on climate change.

The Labour Party's Jens Stoltenberg, a Brundtland protégé, took over in a minority Labour government but lost power in the September 2001 election when Labour posted its worst performance since World War I.

Bondevik once again became Prime Minister in 2001, this time as head of a minority coalition of the Conservatives, Christian Democrats and Liberals, a coalition dependent on support from the Progress Party. This coalition government was the first to stay in office for a complete four-year election period since Per Borten's coalition government of 1965–1969.

Cabinet 2005–2013
A coalition between the Labour Party, Socialist Left Party, and Centre Party, took over  after the 2005 general election, where this coalition obtained a majority of 87 out of 169 seats in the Storting. Jens Stoltenberg became Prime Minister and formed a cabinet known as Stoltenberg's Second Cabinet.

This was a historical coalition in several aspects. It was the first time the Socialist Left sat in cabinet, the first time the Labour Party sat in a coalition government since the 1945 four-month post-war trans-party government (otherwise in government alone), and the first time the Centre Party sat in government along with socialist parties (otherwise in coalition with conservative and other centre parties).

In the 2009 general election the coalition parties kept the majority in the Storting by winning 86 out of 169 seats. Stoltenberg's second cabinet thus continued. There have been several reshuffles in the cabinet during its existence.

Cabinet 2013–2021
In the 2013 election, the incumbent red–green coalition government obtained 72 seats and lost its majority. The election ended with a victory for the four opposition non-socialist parties, winning a total of 96 seats out of 169 (85 needed for a majority). Following convention, Stoltenberg's government resigned and handed over power in October 2013. The Labour Party, however, remained the largest party in parliament with 30.8% of the popular vote. The Progress Party also lost ground, but nevertheless participates in the new cabinet led by Conservative Prime Minister Erna Solberg. Among the smaller parties, the centrist Liberal Party and Christian Peoples Party hold the balance of power. Both campaigned on a change in government. On 30 September the two smaller parties announced that they would support a minority coalition of the Conservative and Progress parties, but they would not take seats in the cabinet themselves. The new Erna Solberg government was re-elected in 2017. In January 2020, right-wing Progress Party left the government. Prime Minister Erna Solberg continued with a minority government consisting of three coalition partners — her own Conservatives, the centrist Liberal Party and the Christian Democrats.

Current cabinet
In the 2021 election, the incumbent Solberg cabinet lost its majority. Jonas Gahr Støre of the Labour Party formed a minority coalition government with the Centre Party. The government relies on the support of the Socialist Left Party in order to secure a majority.
On 14 October 2021, Jonas Gahr Støre, the leader of Norway's center-left Labor Party, was sworn in as new Prime Minister of Norway. His center-left minority government included ten women and nine men.

See also the category Norwegian politicians and list of Norwegian governments.

Legislative branch

Norway has a unicameral parliament, the Storting ("Great Council"), with members elected by popular vote for a four-year term (during which it may not be dissolved) by proportional representation in multi-member constituencies. Voting rights are granted in the year a person turns 18.

The Storting currently has 169 members (increased from 165, effective from the elections of 12 September 2005). The members are elected from the 19 counties for four-year terms according to a system of proportional representation. Until 2009, the Storting divided itself into two chambers, the Odelsting and the Lagting for the sole purpose of voting on legislation. Laws were proposed by the government through a member of the Council of State or by a member of the Odelsting and decided on by the Odelsting and Lagting, in case of repeated disagreement by the joint Storting. In practice, the Lagting rarely disagreed and mainly just rubber-stamped the Odelsting's decision. In February 2007, the Storting passed a constitutional amendment to repeal the division, which abolished the Lagting for the 2009 general election, thereby establishing a fully unicameral system.

Political parties and elections

Elections are to be held every four years on the second Monday of September.

Judicial branch

The Norwegian legal system is a mixture of customary law, civil law system, and common law traditions; the Supreme Court renders advisory opinions to legislature when asked; accepts compulsory ICJ jurisdiction, with reservations.

The regular courts include the Supreme Court with 18 permanent judges and a president, courts of appeal (court of second instance in most cases), city and county courts (court of first instance in most cases), and conciliation councils (court of first instance in most civil-code cases). Judges attached to the regular courts are appointed by the King in council after nomination by the Ministry of Justice.

The special High Court of the Realm hears impeachment cases against members of the government, parliament, or Supreme Court. Following an amendment to the Norwegian constitution in February 2007, impeachment cases are heard by the five highest ranking Supreme Court justices and six lay members in one of the Supreme Court courtrooms The High Court of the Realm had generally lost most of its significance after 1884, and this institution has been passive ever since 1927.

Impeachment
Impeachment may be brought against Members of the Council of State, or of the Supreme Court or of the Storting, for criminal offenses which they may have committed in their official capacity. Indictments are raised by the Storting and judged by five Supreme Court justices and six lay judges.

Administrative divisions

The mainland of Norway is divided into 11 counties (singular ): Agder, Innlandet, Møre og Romsdal, Nordland, Oslo, Rogaland, Vestfold og Telemark, Troms og Finnmark, Trøndelag, Vestland, and Viken. This was reduced in 2020 from 18. In addition are the island group Svalbard and the island Jan Mayen.

Counties and municipalities have local autonomy, but this autonomy is circumscribed by national controls. Counties and municipalities are subject to the oversight of a governor appointed by the King in the Council of State. One governor exercises authority in both Oslo and the adjacent county of Viken. Each county has a directly elected county assembly, led by a mayor, which decides upon matters falling within purview of the counties (upper secondary and vocational education, some culture, transport and social services). There is also a governor on Svalbard, who is under the Ministry of Foreign Affairs and not the Ministry of Local Government and Regional Development as the other counties.

The counties are divided into 356 municipalities (singular ) . The municipalities are led by directly elected assemblies, which elect a board of aldermen and a mayor. Some municipalities, most notably Oslo, have a parliamentary system of government, where the city council elects a city government that is responsible for executive functions. Some municipalities are also divided into municipal districts or city districts (again, Oslo is one of these) responsible for certain welfare and culture services. These districts are also headed by political assemblies, in some cases elected directly by the citizens. The municipalities deal with a wide range of planning issues and welfare services, and are mostly free to engage in activities which are not explicitly restricted by law. Lately, the functions of the counties and municipalities have been the subject of debates, and changes may take place in the near future.

Dependent areas 

Norway has three dependent areas, all in or near Antarctica: Bouvet Island in the South Atlantic Ocean, Queen Maud Land in Antarctica, and Peter I Island off West Antarctica. The Norwegian Act of 27 February 1930 declares these areas are subject to Norwegian sovereignty as dependencies.

An attempt to annex East Greenland ended in defeat at the Hague Tribunal in 1933.

International organization participation

AfDB, AsDB, Australia Group, BIS, CBSS, CE, CERN, EAPC, EBRD, ECE, EFTA, ESA, FAO, IADB, IAEA, IBRD, ICAO, ICCt, ICC, ICFTU, ICRM, IDA, IEA, IFAD, IFC, International IDEA, IFRCS, IHO, ILO, IMF, International Maritime Organization, Inmarsat, Intelsat, Interpol, IOC, IOM, ISO, ITU, MINURSO, NAM (guest), NATO, NC, NEA, NIB, NSG, OECD, OPCW, OSCE, PCA, UN, UNCTAD, UNESCO, UNHCR, UNIDO, UNMIBH, UNMIK, UNMOP, UNTSO, UPU, WCO, WEU (associate), WHO, WIPO, WMO, WTO, Zangger Committee.

References